James Sanford Hamby (July 29, 1897 – October 21, 1991) nicknamed "Cracker", was a professional baseball catcher who played in parts of the 1926 and 1927 seasons for the New York Giants. Of his 55 career at bats, 52 came in 1927, when he had a batting average of .192. In 1926, Hamby had three at-bats late in the season without a hit. Hamby played in the minor leagues through 1933, but never appeared in another major league game.

External links

1897 births
1991 deaths
Major League Baseball catchers
New York Giants (NL) players
Baseball players from North Carolina
People from Wilkesboro, North Carolina